Pyotr Ivanovich Ivashutin (Russian: Пётр Ива́нович Ивашу́тин; September 18, 1909 – June 4, 2002) was a Soviet Army General and head of the state and military security organs, who was deputy chairman of the KGB (1954-1963), temporary acting head of the KGB in 1961 and the longest running head of the GRU.

Biography 
Ivashuin was born into the family of a railway worker. He graduated from a rabfak and joined the All-Union Communist Party (b) in 1931.

Pre-war service 
Mobilized in Red Army in July 1931 by the party, he was called up and sent to military education; in 1933 he graduated from the 7th Stalingrad Military Aviation School. From 1933 he  was an instructor pilot in the same military aviation school; from 1935 he was the commander of the crew of the TB-3 heavy bomber of the 45th air brigade of the Moscow Military District. In 1937 he  was the commander of the TB-3 heavy bomber. From 1937 to 1939 he studied at the Zhukovsky Air Force Engineering Academy of the Red Army. From January 1939  Ivashutin began to work in the counterintelligence agencies of the Red Army. He served in the apparatus of the special department of the NKVD of the Western Military District; and from 1940 as the head of the special department of the NKVD of the 23rd Rifle Division in the Leningrad Military District. He participated in the Soviet-Finnish War.

Second World War 
During the Great Patriotic War from May to October 1941 Ivashutin served as deputy head of the 3rd department of the OO of the Transcaucasian Front. From December 1941 he was Deputy Head of the Special Department of the NKVD of the Crimean Front. From June 1942  served in the same position on the North Caucasian Front; from September 1942  he was appointed Deputy Chief of the Public Organization of the Black Sea Group of Forces of the North Caucasian Front. From January 1943, Ivashutin became head of the SMERSH counterintelligence department of the 47th Army. From April 29, 1943  he was the head of the counterintelligence department SMERSH South-West; from October 1943 he worked on the 3rd Ukrainian fronts. He negotiated with representatives of the Romanian government about the withdrawal from Ukraine and from the war on the side of Nazi Germany.

Post-war service 
From July 1945  Ivashutin became the head of the SMERSH counterintelligence department in the Southern Group of Forces, after 1946 this department was renamed the Counterintelligence Directorate of the Ministry of State Security for the same group of forces he remained in his post. From November 1947  he was Head of the Counterintelligence Directorate of the USSR Ministry of State Security for the Group of Soviet Forces in Germany. From November 1949 to January 1952 he was the chief of counterintelligence at the Ministry of State Security of the Leningrad Military District.

From December 1951 to August 1952 he was deputy chief of the 3rd Main Directorate (military counterintelligence) of the USSR Ministry of State Security. Since September 1952  Ivashutin became Minister of State Security of the Ukrainian SSR. From March 1953  he was Deputy Minister of Internal Affairs of the Ukrainian SSR. Since July 1953  he was Deputy Head of the 3rd Directorate (military counterintelligence) of the USSR Ministry of Internal Affairs. In 1954 he became head of the counterintelligence department in the industry of the Ministry of Internal Affairs.

Immediately after the creation of the KGB of the USSR, he was transferred there and in March 1954 he was appointed head of the 5th department (economic counterintelligence) of the KGB under the Council of Ministers of the USSR.

From June 1954 he was appointed Deputy Chairman of the KGB and from January 1956 the First Deputy Chairman of the KGB under the Council of Ministers of the USSR. During 5 to 13 November 1961 he became the temporary acting Chairman of the KGB at the Council of Ministers of the USSR.

From 1950 to 1954 and from 1966 he was a deputy of the Soviet of Nationalities of the Supreme Soviet of the USSR from the North Ossetian Autonomous Soviet Socialist Republic. Over the years he was a deputy of the Supreme Soviet of the RSFSR and the Supreme Soviet of the Ukrainian SSR.

Chief of the GRU 
From 14 March 1963 to 13 July 1987 Ivashutin became Chief of the Main Intelligence Directorate and Deputy Chief of the General Staff of the USSR Armed Forces.

The total length of service of Pyotr Ivanovich Ivashutin in the GRU was over twenty-four years which made him the longest running GRU chief in the USSR.

One of the primary tasks that Ivashutin had to solve was to minimize the damage inflicted on the GRU by defector Oleg Penkovsky.

On Ivashutin's initiative, the GRU in 1963 began to create a system of round-the-clock information reception and its assessment in order to identify signs of an increase in the combat readiness of foreign armed forces. In other words, a system was created to warn the country's top leadership about military threats in real time. This system later became known as the Command Post. This work, begun by Ivashutin in the 1960s, later became the basis for the creation of the National Center for National Defense Management of the Russian Federation.

In 1963, Ivashutin made a trip to Cuba. The result of this trip was the deployment of a technical intelligence center in Lourdes (a suburb of Havana).

At the insistence of Ivashutin, the construction of a new complex of buildings for the needs of the GRU began on the Khoroshevskoye highway in Moscow. After the first reconnaissance satellites appeared in space, on the initiative of Ivashutin, a Space Intelligence Department also was formed in the GRU.

Later life 
From July 1987, Ivashutin worked in the Group of Inspectors General of the USSR Ministry of Defense. In May 1992 he retired.

Pyotr Ivashutin died on June 4, 2002 in Moscow. He is buried at the Troyekurovskoye Cemetery.

Security and military ranks 

 State Security Captain - 02/04/1939;
 Major of State Security - 04/16/1942;
 Colonel - 02/14/1943;
 Major general - 05/26/1943;
 Lieutenant general - 09/25/1944;
 Colonel general - 02/18/1958;
 General of the Army - 02/23/1971.

Honors and awards 

 Hero of the Soviet Union (02/21/1985, for the courage and courage shown in the struggle against the German fascist invaders during the Great Patriotic War, and for successful activities to strengthen the Armed Forces of the USSR in the postwar period ).
 Order "For Merit to the Fatherland", III degree (28/08/1999).
 3 Orders of Lenin (09/13/1944, 02/21/1978, 02/21/1985).
 Marshal's Star (01/11/1974).
 Order of the October Revolution (02/21/1974).
 5 Orders of the Red Banner (03/19/1944, 05/23/1952, 02/21/1964, 10/31/1967, 04/28/1980).
 Order of Bohdan Khmelnitsky, 1st class (04/28/1945).
 2 Orders of Kutuzov, II degree (06/29/1945, 11/04/1981 - based on the results of the West-81 exercises ).
 2 Orders of the Patriotic War, I degree (10/26/1943, 03/11/1985).
 Order of the Red Banner of Labor (07/10/1959).
3 Orders of the Red Star (04/07/1940, 04/17/1943, 11/06/1946)
The highest departmental awards of the state security agencies of the USSR:
Honored Worker of the NKVD (1942)
Honorary State Security Officer (1958)
Badge "For service in military intelligence" (No. 001, awarded on 05/11/1998)

References

1909 births
2002 deaths
People from Brest, Belarus
Members of the Supreme Soviet of the Russian Soviet Federative Socialist Republic, 1963–1967
Third convocation members of the Soviet of Nationalities
Seventh convocation members of the Soviet of Nationalities
Eighth convocation members of the Soviet of Nationalities
Ninth convocation members of the Soviet of Nationalities
Tenth convocation members of the Soviet of Nationalities
Eleventh convocation members of the Soviet of Nationalities
Sixth convocation members of the Supreme Soviet of the Soviet Union
Second convocation members of the Verkhovna Rada of the Ukrainian Soviet Socialist Republic
Heroes of the Soviet Union
Recipients of the Medal "For Distinction in Guarding the State Border of the USSR"
Recipients of the Medal of Zhukov
Recipients of the Order "For Merit to the Fatherland", 3rd class
Recipients of the Order of Bogdan Khmelnitsky (Soviet Union), 1st class
Recipients of the Order of Kutuzov, 2nd class
Recipients of the Order of the Red Banner
Recipients of the Order of the Red Banner of Labour
Recipients of the Order of the Red Star
Recipients of the Patriotic Order of Merit in bronze
Recipients of the Scharnhorst Order
GRU Chiefs
GRU officers
KGB chairmen
Soviet generals
Soviet military personnel of the Winter War
Soviet spies
World War II spies for the Soviet Union
Burials in Troyekurovskoye Cemetery